is a Japanese manga series written by Kafka Asagiri and illustrated by Sango Harukawa, which has been serialized in Kadokawa Shoten's seinen manga magazine Young Ace since 2012. The series follows the members of the "Armed Detective Agency" as they try to protect Yokohama from the mafia. The show mainly focuses on the weretiger Atsushi Nakajima, who joins others gifted with supernatural powers to accomplish different tasks including running a business, solving mysteries, and carrying out missions assigned by the agency.

Multiple light novels have been published. An anime television series adaptation produced by Bones aired in 2016 in two parts; the first part aired between April and June 2016, and the second part aired between October and December 2016. An anime film, Bungo Stray Dogs: Dead Apple, was released in March 2018. A third season aired between April and June 2019. A fourth season premiered in January 2023.

A spin-off television series adaptation of Bungo Stray Dogs Wan! aired from January to March 2021. A live-action film, Bungo Stray Dogs The Movie: Beast, was released in Japan in January 2022.

Plot

The story focuses on a young adult named Atsushi Nakajima. After being kicked out of his orphanage, Atsushi stops the suicide of a detective named Osamu Dazai believing he was drowning in the river. During his interactions with Dazai, Atsushi learns he is gifted with a supernatural ability capable of transforming him into a berserker white tiger in the moonlight; this made the orphanage torture him and kick him out in the past. Dazai recruits him into the Agency and there he meets many other ability users as they tackle various cases and events taking place within the city of Yokohama, a place teeming with individuals with Supernatural Abilities. Atsushi becomes the target of the Port Mafia member Ryūnosuke Akutagawa, as there is a bounty on his head on the black market.

During Atsushi's fights against the mafia, he also meets Francis Scott Key Fitzgerald, the leader of the Fellowship of the Guild who placed the bounty on his head. Fitzgerald reveals there is a supernatural book capable of changing reality linked with Atsushi's tiger, hence putting a bounty on the black market. Fitzgerald disregards any superficial damage the Guild might bring to Yokohama in exchange for the book, having an airship named "Moby Dick" destroy the city. However, he is nearly killed by Atsushi and Akutagawa once joining forces while former mafia member Kyoka Izumi stops Moby Dick.

Another man known as Fyodor Dostoyevsky appears wishing to obtain the book to in order to erase all gifted people. He sets up a fatal clash between the detectives and the mafia but the true leader behind this organization, Natsume Soseki, stops the fight. While Atsushi and Akutagawa corner the virus' originator, Dazai manages to arrest Dostoyevsky with Fitzgerald's help. However, Dostoyevsky is later revealed to have orchestrated his own imprisonment in order to lead his followers. Pages of the book are later found by Dostoyevsky's group The Decay of Angels who uses its powers to frame the Agency for a murder case. Dazai is imprisoned alongside Dostoyevsky and the government sends its military forces known as the Hunting Dogs to execute the members from the Agency. As the Agency faces defeat, they form an alliance with Fitzgerald and the mafia in exchange for one of their followers. Across the multiple fights, it is revealed there is another person above Dostoyevsky and that person must be stopped. During an encounter with one of Fyodor's allies, Sigma, Atsushi discovers that the leader of Decay of Angels is a person codenamed Kamui. Ranpo Edogawa then manages to gather the Agency and prove their innocence to the law. After this, he uses his skills to determine Kamui's identity: Ōchi Fukuchi, the leader of the Hunting Dogs. Upon being found, Fukuchi tries to kill Ranpo but is stopped by Atsushi. Having realized Atsushi would not be able to face Fukuchi alone, Dazai had requested Akutagawa to aid. However, both Atsushi and Akutagawa are defeated by their enemy with the latter sacrificing himself in his last moments to let Atsushi escape. After the battle with Kamui, the next stage for the Decay of the Angel plan commences - turning people into vampires and eventually controlling humankind. The  decides to release One Order, an ability weapon that can help suppress the vampire infection. Knowing Kamui's identity, the Armed Detective Agency also plans their move to retrieve the weapon.

Development
The manga originated from Kafka Asagiri's idea to gather multiple famous late authors and poets and draw them as young adults and teenagers with supernatural powers. Sango Harukawa provided Asagiri with designs which helped the writer write the stories easier. Asagiri stated that the designs of Atsushi and Dazai were done to contrast each other although there were some revisions done in the making of the series. Besides the common narrative produced through the manga, Asagiri also wrote light novels which would be aimed for casual readers. The light novels were also written with the idea of having more books released per year. The lives of more writers inspired Asagiri, most notably the friendship of Osamu Dazai, Ango Sakaguchi and Sakunosuke Oda.

Media

Manga

Written by Kafka Asagiri and illustrated by Sango Harukawa, Bungo Stray Dogs began publishing the manga in Kadokawa Shoten's seinen magazine Young Ace on 4 December 2012. Kadokawa has collected its chapters into individual tankōbon volume. The first volume was released on 4 April 2013. As of 28 December 2022 twenty-three volumes have been released.

The series has been licensed for North America by Yen Press with the first volume being released on 20 December 2016. The English translation is by Kevin Gifford. As of June 2022, twenty-one volumes have been published.

A manga based on the light novel Beast, which is illustrated by Shiwasu Hoshikawa, debuted in Monthly Shōnen Ace on 26 December 2019. This spin-off manga features Ryūnosuke Akutagawa, who joins the Armed Detective Agency, and Atsushi Nakajima as a subordinate of the Port Mafia.

A spin-off manga centered around Dazai and Chuya's backstories titled, Bungo Stray Dogs: Dazai, Chūya, Jūgosai, began serialization in Monthly Shōnen Ace in July 2022.

Anime

An anime television series adaptation produced by Bones was directed by Takuya Igarashi and written by Yōji Enokido.  Nobuhiro Arai and Hiroshi Kanno served as the chief animation directors, while the former also served as character designer along with Ryō Hirata.  Taku Iwasaki composed the series' music. Kazuhiro Wakabayashi was the series' sound director at Glovision. Additionally, Yumiko Kondou was the art director, Yukari Goto was the anime's color designer, Tsuyoshi Kanbayashi was the director of photography and Shigeru Nishiyama was the editor. Granrodeo performed the anime's opening theme, titled "Trash Candy", and Luck Life performed the anime's ending theme, titled .

The series was split into two halves: the first half, containing twelve episodes, premiered on 7 April 2016 and ended on 23 June 2016, being broadcast on Tokyo MX, Teletama, Chiba TV, tvk, GBS (Gifu Broadcasting), Mie TV, SUN, TVQ Kyushu, and BS11. The second half, also containing twelve episodes, premiered on 6 October 2016 and ended on 22 December 2016. The series has been licensed for streaming by Crunchyroll. As for the second half, Screen Mode sung the opening theme titled "Reason Living" while Luck Life once again sung the ending theme titled .

An OVA was bundled with the 13th limited edition manga volume, which was released on 31 August 2017.

On 21 July 2018, it was announced that the series would receive a third season. The cast and staff would reprise their roles from the previous two seasons. The third season premiered from 12 April 2019 and ended on 28 June 2019, being broadcast on Tokyo MX, TVA, KBS, SUN, BS11, and Wowow. Granrodeo performed the third seasons' opening theme  and Luck Life performed the third season's ending theme "Lily". Funimation released the simuldub on 17 May 2019.        

In June 2020, Kadokawa announced that an anime television series adaptation of the spin-off manga, Bungo Stray Dogs Wan!, was in production.  Satonobu Kikuchi directed the series, with Kazuyuki Fudeyasu handling series composition, Hiromi Daimi designing the characters, and Bones and Nomad handling production. The main cast members reprised their roles.  The series aired from 13 January to 31 March 2021 on Tokyo MX, BS11, MBS, Wowow.

On 7 November 2021, it was announced that the series would receive a fourth season. The fourth season premiered on 4 January 2023. Screen Mode performed the opening theme "True Story", and Luck Life performed the ending theme .

The anime is licensed in North America by Crunchyroll (formerly known as Funimation) with home video distribution, and in the United Kingdom by Anime Limited.

Theatrical films

At the  Inu-tachi no Utage Sono Ni event on 19 February 2017 a film project based on the manga series was announced. Titled Bungo Stray Dogs: Dead Apple, the film premiered on 3 March 2018 with the staff and cast from the anime series returning to reprise their roles.

A live-action film was announced in July 2019. Titled Bungo Stray Dogs The Movie: Beast, the film premiered on 7 January 2022.

Video game
An action role-playing game titled Bungo Stray Dogs Mayoi Inu Kaikitan was announced and released on iOS and Android. The game includes character side stories that were not found in the anime series as well as new game-exclusive scenarios.

The gameplay involves using pinball machine-like mechanics to defeat enemies, and earning a combination of materials, ability stones, and gold. Materials and gold can be used for powering up and evolving characters, while ability stones are most often used for scouts, to unlock more characters in-game.

Stage plays
A stage play based on the events in the first season of the anime was realized starting at the KAAT Kanagawa Arts Theatre in Yokohama from December 2017, with the play moving through major cities in Japan. It was also shown at the Morinomiya Piloti Hall in Osaka on 12–13 January, and at AiiA 2.5 Theater Tokyo from 31 January to 4 February. Starting in September 2018, a second stage play was done based on the light novel Dazai Osamu and the Dark Era and its anime adaptation in the second season of the show. It was first shown in Tokyo at the Sunshine Gekijō from 22 September to 8 October and then moved to Osaka where it ran at the Morinomiya Piloti Hall on 13–14 October. A third stage play based on the rest of the second season, thus excluding Dazai's backstory at the beginning of the season, was performed from June to July 2019 in Iwate, Fukuoka, Aichi and Osaka, and in July in Tokyo.

Light Novels 
Multiple light novels have been released, each focusing on a character-specific story not seen until then. These often introduce new characters to the series that weren't previously canon. 

There are currently ten novels in total, with only eight having English translations.

Reception

Manga
Bungo Stray Dogs was well received in Japan. As of late 2016, the manga sold 4.1 million books. The series also appeared in the Da Vinci magazine poll from Kadokawa Shoten, while the franchise combined sold ¥1,878,804,092 in 2016. By 2018, the series reached 6 million copies. It came in at number 11 for the "Nationwide Bookstore Employees' Recommended Comics of 2014". On TV Asahi's Manga Sōsenkyo 2021 poll, in which 150.000 people voted for their top 100 manga series, Bungo Stray Dogs ranked 64th. Author Dan Brown was attracted by the manga when the author created a fictional version of himself to promote the story. Brown stated he was pleased with the result. 

Critical reception to the series has been positive. The Fandom Post said ever since its start the series has had potential to be an entertaining manga, citing the characterization of Atsushi and the power he has, later leading to interesting mystery arcs when more characters from multiple parties become involved, such as the reluctant alliance Atsushi and his rival Akutagawa form to defeat another group. The artwork was praised by UK Anime Network for how detailed are fight scenes while also praising the balance between dark and light plot storylines. Nevertheless, he found a common commentary within fans that the series suffers from a slow pace. While liking the Kunikida subplot, Anime News Network criticized the emotional focus on Atsushi's emotional state in the manga as he often is grieves about his background and the way emotions he is given to deal with when his torturer passes away make him forced.

Anime
The anime series and its film have been popular, appearing in multiple polls, involving its style, cosplay among others. Atomix listed it as the fifth best anime from 2016, praising its premise, designs and references to writers. In the Newtype Anime Awards 2016–2017 at the Machi Asobi Vol. 19 event, the anime series took the second place in "Best television series" behind Fate/Apocrypha. Rebecca Silverman from Anime News Network listed the third season of the anime as one of her favorite anime from early 2019. The home media releases of the series were also popular in Japan, achieving good sales. The film Dead Apple was also the winner of Newtypes "Theatrical Film Award" in 2018. In 2019, the series once again took second place in the best television series award behind Demon Slayer: Kimetsu no Yaiba in the same magazine's awards.

Notes

References

External links
  
  at Kadokawa Corporation 
 

2014 Japanese novels
2021 anime television series debuts
Action anime and manga
Bandai Namco franchises
Bones (studio)
Crunchyroll anime
Funimation
Kadokawa Beans Bunko
Kadokawa Dwango franchises
Kadokawa Shoten manga
Light novels
Mystery anime and manga
Nomad (company)
Seinen manga
Shōnen manga
Supernatural anime and manga
Television series about World War III
Television shows set in Yokohama
Tokyo MX original programming
Yen Press titles